The Terauchi Cabinet is the 18th Cabinet of Japan led by Terauchi Masatake from October 9, 1916, to September 29, 1918.

Cabinet

References 

Cabinet of Japan
1916 establishments in Japan
Cabinets established in 1916
Cabinets disestablished in 1918